Ernobius mollis, also known as the pine bark anobiid, pine knot borer, bark borer, or waney edge borer, is a species of beetle in the family Ptinidae.

Subspecies
These two subspecies belong to the species Ernobius mollis:
 Ernobius mollis espanoli Johnson, 1975 g
 Ernobius mollis mollis (Linnaeus, 1758) g
Data sources: i = ITIS, c = Catalogue of Life, g = GBIF, b = Bugguide.net

References

Further reading

 
 
 
 

Ptinidae
Beetles described in 1758
Taxa named by Carl Linnaeus